"Being" is a song recorded by Argentine singer Lali. The track appears on A Bailar (2014), her debut studio album. The song was written by Lali, Peter Akselrad, Luis Burgio, Gustavo Novello and Antonella Giunta, and produced by 3musica. The song was released on March 25, 2015, along with the digital release of A Bailar.

References

2014 songs
Lali Espósito songs
Songs written by Gustavo Novello
Songs written by Pablo Akselrad
Songs written by Lali Espósito